Danilo Arbilla (born 1943 in Casupá) is a Uruguayan journalist and entrepreneur. He was a former President of the Inter American Press Association who had shared the 1992 Maria Moors Cabot prize.

References 

Maria Moors Cabot Prize winners
Uruguayan journalists
People from Florida Department
1943 births
Living people